Rocinante is the horse in the novel Don Quixote.

Rocinante may also refer to:
 Rocinante, a 1987 film directed by Eduardo Guedes starring John Hurt and Ian Dury
 Rosinante, a science fiction trilogy by Alexis A. Gilliland
 Rocinante, the modified camper truck in John Steinbeck's Travels with Charley
 Rocinante, a fictional spaceship in the songs of the Cygnus X-1 duology by Rush
 Rocinante, the main characters' spaceship in novel series The Expanse by James S. A. Corey, as well as the TV series The Expanse
 Rocinante, a car in Graham Greene's Monsignor Quixote
 Rocinante or mu Arae d, an exoplanet
 Donquixote Rocinante (Rosinante), the brother of One Piece antagonist Donquixote Doflamingo
 Rozinante or Roz, the name Dervla Murphy gave to her bicycle in Full Tilt: Ireland to India with a Bicycle